Dudley is an unincorporated community and census-designated place (CDP) in Fall River County, South Dakota, United States. The population was 28 at the 2020 census. It was first listed as a CDP prior to the 2020 census.

It is bordered to the south by the Cheyenne River, an east-flowing tributary of the Missouri River. It is bordered to the west by the BNSF Railway and to the north by an abandoned line of the Burlington Northern Railroad, now part of the George S. Mickelson Trail.

U.S. Route 18 passes just north of Dudley, leading northeast  to Hot Springs and west the same distance to Mule Creek Junction, Wyoming.

Demographics

References 

Census-designated places in Fall River County, South Dakota
Census-designated places in South Dakota